The Royal Geographical Society Islands (Inuinnaqtun: Hiurarjuaq; "big sand")  formerly the Royal Geographical Society Group are a group of islands lying west of King William Island in Victoria Strait, within the Queen Maud Gulf, in the north Canadian territory of Nunavut.

Davidson Point is named after geographer George Davidson. The islands were named by Captain Roald Amundsen for the Royal Geographical Society, a sponsor. According to Amundsen the islands had been reported by John Rae, who had not recognised them as islands.

References 

Uninhabited islands of Kitikmeot Region
Royal Geographical Society